Alkali Lake State Airport , is a public airport located  northeast of Alkali Lake in Lake County, Oregon, United States.

History
The Alkali Lake State Airport was originally constructed in the early 1940s by the Oregon State Highway Department for the U.S. Bureau of Public Roads. The permit from the Bureau of Land Management for use of the land was transferred from Oregon State Highway Department to Oregon State Board of Aeronautics in 1956.

The location of Alkali Lake State Airport is important to the State's airport system from a geographic coverage and access standpoint. The airport's role in the system is primarily one of providing access to a remote, sparsely populated area. Alkali Lake State Airport is categorized as a level 5, non-NPIAS airport. 

There is no lodging near Alkali Lake State Airport; however, airport camping is permitted. Campers are asked to remember that Alkali Lake is located in the dry Oregon high desert and to use care when staying at this location.

References

External links

Airports in Lake County, Oregon
Flight Strips of the United States Army Air Forces
Airfields of the United States Army Air Forces in Oregon
1942 establishments in Oregon

oregon.gov/aviation/Pages/Alkali-Lake.aspx